The Channel Islands National Marine Sanctuary is a sanctuary off the Pacific coast in Southern California, providing protection for its natural and cultural resources through education, conservation, science, and stewardship. 

Its extension encompasses the waters surrounding the isles of Anacapa, Santa Cruz, Santa Rosa, San Miguel and Santa Barbara Islands. These are five of the eight Channel Islands of California. Ranging from a high tide of approximately 11 kilometers offshore around each of the five islands, the sanctuary is home to a variety of marine species, including whales that come to array each year. It also provides protection to more than 150 historic shipwrecks and is a place of important cultural significance for the Chumash people. 

The National Marine Sanctuary program is under the administration of the National Oceanic and Atmospheric Administration.

Recreational activities

The sanctuary is also a site for recreational activities, such as scuba diving, snorkeling, kayaking, boating, guided trips and sailing, viewing whales and other wildlife, and fishing. The sanctuary is home to a diverse array of marine mammals.

In an effort to balance recreation and conservation, the California Fish and Game Commission established a network of Marine Protected Areas (MPAs) within the nearshore waters of the sanctuary in 2002. NOAA expanded the MPA network into the sanctuary's deeper waters in 2006 and 2007. The entire MPA network consists of 11 marine reserves; Richardson Rock, Judith Rock, Harris Point, South Point, Carrington Point, Skunk Point, Gull Island, Painted Cave, Scorpion, Footprint, and Anacapa Island. All take and harvest from these marine reserves is prohibited. There are two marine conservation areas that allow limited take of lobster and pelagic fish. This MPA network encompasses 241 square nautical miles (318 square miles).

More than 150 historic ships and aircraft have been reported lost within the waters of the sanctuary, although just 25 have been discovered to date. Scuba divers can view some of the protected wrecks within the sanctuary but should be mindful that removal of any artifacts is prohibited by federal regulations.

Education

The Channel Islands National Marine Sanctuary is dedicated to education and outreach. Its programs help teach about understanding and conservation of marine resources.

MERITO
The Multicultural Education for Resource Issues Threatening Oceans (MERITO) is a multicultural education program which partners with the sanctuary. MERITO (which means ‘merit’ in Spanish) includes a bilingual outreach program, internships, and the CINMS-sponsored MERITO academy.

Visitors Centers, Education Partners and Related Organizations
Its visitor center and exhibits display, promote and interpret the importance of the sanctuary and the resources it protects. Furthermore, the Channel Islands Naturalist Corps, is a group of specially trained volunteers dedicated to educating passengers on board whale watch vessels visiting the sanctuary and Channel Islands National Park.

MPA Education
Sanctuary staff work with the Sanctuary Education Team (SET), a working group of the Sanctuary Advisory Council, to identify target audiences, outreach tools, and delivery methods to communicate messages about the MPA network. Educational tools include workshops for teachers and students, curriculum materials, signage and exhibits, multimedia products and adult education programs.

Outreach Products
The sanctuary distributes brochures and pamphlets for the public covering topics such as boat safety, scuba diver safety and responsible whale watching to promote responsible use of the sanctuary. The official website also contains additional information such as a shipwreck database, an encyclopedia of species found within the sanctuary, and a marine mammal sightings database.

Teacher and Student Resources
Long term Monitoring Program and Experiential Training for Students is an environmental monitoring and education program for students, educators and volunteer groups throughout California to collect rocky intertidal and sandy beach data.
MERITO Academy is multicultural education professional development program for 5-8th grade teachers which includes lesson plans, classroom visits and field trips.
The NOAA California Bay Watershed Education and Training (B-WET) Program provides funds to support environment-based education throughout the watersheds of San Francisco Bay, Monterey Bay, and Santa Barbara Channel. Funded projects provide meaningful watershed educational experiences to students, teachers, and communities.
The mission of NOAA’s Teacher at Sea (TAS) program is to give teachers a clearer insight into our ocean planet, a greater understanding of maritime work and studies, and to increase their level of environmental literacy by fostering an interdisciplinary research experience.

Research

The sanctuary has partnerships with National Marine Fisheries Service, the National Park Service and the Department of Fisheries and Oceans Canada, as well as regional and international academic institutions such as the University of California, Santa Barbara, Scripps Institution of Oceanography, Woods Hole Oceanographic Institution, Simon Fraser University and the University of Auckland, New Zealand. These partnerships are facilitated by staff research expertise as well as operational support provided by the NOAA research vessels Shearwater and Shark Cat.

The sanctuary is currently engaging in the following research:

MPA monitoring
Within the sanctuary, there is a network of 13 state and federal marine reserves and conservation areas that provide additional protections to the ecosystem. The marine reserves network was established to protect whole ecosystems and restore ecosystem health. One possible effect of marine reserves is that they may provide "spillover benefits” to areas outside the reserves. Sanctuary staff is currently conducting research on the effectiveness of marine reserves for community dynamics. In one project, performed in collaboration with the Channel Islands National Park and colleagues at Simon Fraser University in Burnaby B.C., staff are evaluating the food web interactions expressed in the long-term, Kelp Forest Monitoring data set that the Channel Islands National Park has been collecting since 1984. That project has revealed that trophic relationships within MPAs are more robust, while outside MPAs these relationships are less so and the food web shows lower resilience and stability. In other work, with colleagues at the University of Auckland, they are examining potential competition between predators protected within MPAs (large fish and lobsters) and fishers who are targeting the prey of those predators (sea urchins). In addition, the sanctuary’s ongoing maintenance of a network of oceanographic sensors provides a data stream that can contribute to our understanding of larval transport and adult animal movement across MPA boundaries.

Climate variability

Sanctuary staff are currently looking at how short-term changes in climate can affect local conditions across large areas. Their work on the role of variability in jet stream trajectory and strength in determining seasonal variability in central Siberia allows a new and significantly more accurate ability to forecast the arrival of harsh winters several months in advance. This work has contributed to a better, more mechanistic understanding of the connectedness of climate processes across the Northern Hemisphere, from Siberia all the way to the US West Coast. More recently, they are looking at how these same processes manifest in long term data on winds along the Central and Southern California coast to see how climate variability signals can affect local winds in the Santa Barbara Channel area. Variation in wind strength has ecological effects by driving upwelling and also has a practical implication for local mariners: if climate change causes more windy days, there are fewer days for boating and fishing in the sanctuary. Additionally, the sanctuary’s ongoing maintenance of a network of moorings provides a continuous data series of oceanographic conditions in nearshore waters that is informing climate variability studies.

SAMSAP
The Sanctuary Aerial Monitoring and Spatial Analysis Program (SAMSAP) is an ongoing long-term aerial monitoring program that collects data on vessel and visitor use patterns and cetacean populations within the sanctuary. SAMSAP has been active since 1997 and has been instrumental in providing vital data for management, research, and emergency response needs.

Whale research
After populations of large whales were decimated by whaling in the last two centuries, several species are rebounding. Channel Islands National Marine Sanctuary is a seasonal home to several species of those large whales. From early spring to late fall, the sanctuary sees increasing numbers of humpback, blue, and fin whales- with seasonally migrating gray whales transiting the sanctuary on their trips between the North Pacific and the lagoons of Baja California. At times, large whales aggregate in tremendous numbers, with as many as 186 unique photo identifications occurring in a single day. Understanding the causes of this aggregation, such as bloom dynamics of the krill the whales feed on, can provide valuable forecasting information to predict where whales are likely to be in the near term. This information in turn could aid in reducing whale-ship interactions. Ongoing work has focused on behavioral responses of large whales to close encounters with large vessels transiting the Santa Barbara Channel. This work is being extended to focus on two problems: how variability in krill depth is key to whale decision making, and how the whales are selecting specific sized prey within pools of mixed-age krill. To get after these questions, sanctuary staff and contractors are combining an ongoing program of tagging large whales with time-depth-location recording tags with systematic mapping of krill fields around the sanctuary. The sanctuary is assisting the work of partners from Cascadia Research Collective and Scripps Institution of Oceanography.

Shipping
The Port of Los Angeles and Long Beach is the largest commercial harbor on the west coast with over 6,500 vessels stopping each year. Much of that traffic passes the Santa Barbara Channel and the Channel Islands National Marine Sanctuary on its way to ports around the Pacific Rim. These vessels are large, with some being over 1,000 feet long, and fast; they can travel at speeds over 20 knots. They also emit significant exhaust into the area and are the principal source of underwater noise in the sanctuary. To keep track of how these ships may affect the sanctuary staff have been building on a long-term program to monitor broad band acoustics in and around the sanctuary. As a first step they are developing data management solutions with partners at the Scripps Institution of Oceanography and the National Center for Ecological Analysis and Synthesis for two new data streams: broadband acoustic data and Automatic Identification System (AIS) data on ship travel. Although both sources of data were originally developed for other objectives—oceanographic research and safety at sea—these data streams provide valuable information for evaluation of spatial use patterns. For example, recent work evaluating California State air quality rulings on vessel fuel use demonstrated a major change in traffic patterns and emerging conflicts in use of the ocean by shipping and National Defense interests. Evaluating these data in the context of shifts of vessel traffic has also revealed quantitative relationships between economic indicators (numbers of ships and amount of cargo) and noise levels in the sanctuary.

Deep water communities
The sanctuary contains a significant amount of deep-water habitat: about 91.5% of the sanctuary is deeper than 100 ft. From depths of 100 ft to over 5,000 ft, deep water habitat experiences cold water, almost no light, and low oxygen, yet a variety of specially adapted animals such as corals, sponges, crabs, shrimp, fish, anemones, cucumbers, sea stars, and worms reside here. In 2010, a NOAA expedition surveyed an underwater feature in the Footprint Marine Reserve to learn more about the abundance and distribution of coral and sponge habitat and to study the chemistry of the water in which these animals live.

Maritime Heritage
Channel Islands National Marine Sanctuary is responsible for the protection and preservation of submerged remains of the past that occupy the bottomlands of the sanctuary. Cultural and historic submerged sites include archaeological remains of shipwrecks and prehistoric land sites. Sanctuary stewardship responsibilities include a mandate to inventory sites, encourage research, provide public education and oversee responsible visitor use.

Chumash

The Northern Channel Islands have been home to the Chumash people for millennia, with the earliest known human remains dating back more than 13,000 years ago. The Chumash community continues to celebrate their maritime heritage through local cultural events, such as an annual crossing of the Santa Barbara Channel on traditional plank canoes known as tomols.

Protected species

All species listed are found within Channel Islands National Marine Sanctuary and are recognized as endangered, threatened, or as a species of concern under the Endangered Species Act and/or California Endangered Species Act.

Endangered species found within the sanctuary
The species listed below are categorized by Federal and California state government as endangered:

 White abalone
 Tidewater goby
 Blue whale
 Humpback whale
 Fin whale
 Sei whale
 Sperm whale
 California least tern
 Black abalone
 Leatherback sea turtle
 Green sea turtle

Threatened species found within the sanctuary 
The species listed below are categorized by Federal and California state government as threatened:

 Scripps's murrelet
 Guadalupe murrelet
 Southern sea otter
 Canary rockfish
 Snowy plover
 Island Fox

Species of concern found within the sanctuary 
The species listed below are categorized by Federal and California state government as species of concern

 Copper rockfish
 Brown rockfish
 Pink abalone
 Bocaccio rockfish
 Ashy storm petrel

Delisted species found within the sanctuary 
The species listed below are categorized by Federal and California state government as delisted

 Peregrine falcon
 Gray whale
 Brown pelican
 Bald eagle
 Steller sea lion

Sanctuary Advisory Council
The  Council was established in December 1998 to assure continued public participation in management of the sanctuary. It provides a public forum for consultation and community deliberation on resource management issues affecting the waters surrounding the Channel Islands. It is composed of 21 members and 21 alternate seats that include local stakeholder groups and governmental agencies.

Threats to the sanctuary
Protecting the resources of Channel Islands National Marine Sanctuary is a collaborative effort involving local, state and federal agencies as well as numerous non-governmental organizations. The sanctuary focuses on education, permitting, regulations, emergency response preparedness, enforcement, and consultation with other agencies to help protect the sanctuary's resources. 

Current threats in the sanctuary include ship strikes on endangered whales, ocean acidification, invasive species, damage to eelgrass beds, marine debris, poaching, and water pollution.

See also
Channel Islands National Marine Sanctuary at Commons

References

External links

 Official Channel Islands National Marine Sanctuary Website
 http://mcbi.marine-conservation.org/what/what_pdfs/Channel_Islands.pdf
 http://www.eoearth.org/article/Channel_Islands_National_Marine_Sanctuary
 https://web.archive.org/web/20120109063517/http://www.edcnet.org/learn/current_cases/marine_conservation/sbchannel_issues/index.html
 http://channelislands.noaa.gov
 http://sanctuaries.noaa.gov/report2011/pdf/cinms.pdf

Channel Islands of California
Marine sanctuaries in California
National Marine Sanctuaries of the United States
Protected areas of Santa Barbara County, California
Protected areas of Ventura County, California
Protected areas of Southern California
1980 establishments in California
Protected areas established in 1980